Beautiful Deformity is the seventh studio album by Japanese visual kei rock band The Gazette, released on October 23, 2013 in Japan by Sony Music Records and in the UK, Europe and Russia by JPU Records. It includes the single Fadeless.

The album peaked at No. 8 in the Oricon charts.

Track listing

DVD (limited edition only)
 "Malformed Box" Music Clip
 "Inside Beast" Music Clip

References

The Gazette (band) albums
2013 albums